

Career
Valandro began his professional career in the Aimoré in 1974. Later he played for the teams: 14 de Julho, Juventude, Santa Cruz, Náutico, Rio Ave and Lausanne, where he finished his career in 1989.

As a manager, Valandro worked as an assistant in the Cruzeiro and América Mineiro (youth team). Since 1995 he has coached the following: Novo Hamburgo, Portuguesa (youth), Operário, Comercial-AL, Botafogo-PB, Caxias, Criciúma, Paulista, Náutico, Joinville, Vila Nova, Goiás, Avaí, Atlético Goianiense, Juventude, Paysandu, Brasiliense, Remo, Asa and Anapolina.

Honours
 Operário
 Campeonato Sul-Mato-Grossense: 1997

Criciúma
 Campeonato Brasileiro Série B: 2002

Vila Nova
Campeonato Goiano: 2005

Paysandu
Campeonato Paraense: 2009

References

External links
  
 
 Profile at Soccerpunter.com

1955 births
Living people
People from Caxias do Sul
Association football defenders
Brazilian footballers
Brazilian football managers
Expatriate footballers in Portugal
Expatriate footballers in Switzerland
Campeonato Brasileiro Série A players
Campeonato Brasileiro Série B players
Primeira Liga players
Swiss Super League players
Campeonato Brasileiro Série A managers
Campeonato Brasileiro Série B managers
Campeonato Brasileiro Série C managers
Clube Esportivo Aimoré players
Esporte Clube Juventude players
Santa Cruz Futebol Clube players
Clube Náutico Capibaribe players
Rio Ave F.C. players
FC Lausanne-Sport players
Valeriodoce Esporte Clube players
Esporte Clube Novo Hamburgo managers
Operário Futebol Clube (MS)
Botafogo Futebol Clube (PB) managers
Sociedade Esportiva e Recreativa Caxias do Sul managers
Criciúma Esporte Clube managers
Paulista Futebol Clube managers
Clube Náutico Capibaribe managers
Joinville Esporte Clube managers
Vila Nova Futebol Clube managers
Goiás Esporte Clube managers
Avaí FC managers
Atlético Clube Goianiense managers
Esporte Clube Juventude managers
Paysandu Sport Club managers
Brasiliense Futebol Clube managers
Clube do Remo managers
Agremiação Sportiva Arapiraquense managers
Associação Atlética Anapolina managers
Sportspeople from Rio Grande do Sul